Paramount Streaming (formerly CBS Digital Media Group, CBS Interactive, and ViacomCBS Streaming) is a division of Paramount Global that oversees the company's video streaming technology and offers direct-to-consumer services, free, premium and pay.  These include Pluto TV, which has more than 250 live and original channels, and Paramount+, a subscription service that combines breaking news, live sports, and premium entertainment.

History

As CBS Interactive 
On May 30, 2007, CBS Interactive acquired Last.fm for £140 million (US$280 million).

On June 30, 2008, CNET Networks was acquired by CBS and the assets were merged into CBS Interactive, including Metacritic, GameSpot, TV.com, and Movietome.

On March 15, 2012, it was announced that CBS Interactive acquired video game-based website Giant Bomb and comic book-based website Comic Vine from Whiskey Media, who sold off their other remaining websites to BermanBraun. This occasion marked the return of video game journalist Jeff Gerstmann to the CBS Interactive division of video game websites, which includes GameSpot and GameFAQs, and has Gerstmann once again working directly with some of his former peers at GameSpot within the same building at the CBS Interactive headquarters.

On April 17, 2012, it was announced that Major League Gaming and CBS Interactive would be entering a partnership alongside Twitch to be the only exclusive online broadcaster of their Pro Circuit competitions, as well as for advertising representation.

CBS Corp./Viacom re-merger and afterwards 

On November 4, 2019, Variety reported that Jim Lanzone would be leaving the company after 9 years to become an executive in residence at Benchmark Capital and would be succeeded by Marc DeBevoise.

CBS Interactive's parent CBS Corporation merged with sister company Viacom on December 4, 2019, forming ViacomCBS. 

On September 14, 2020, it was announced that Red Ventures would acquire the “CNET Media Group” from ViacomCBS for $500 million, which was finalized on October 30, 2020.

After the divestment of the “CNET Media Group”, CBS Interactive was dissolved after an organizational restructuring and renamed ViacomCBS Streaming in order to accelerate ViacomCBS 'direct-to-consumer streaming strategies.

On March 4, 2021, ViacomCBS Streaming renamed CBS All Access to Paramount+, with additional streaming content and rebranding taking place at that time.

In late 2021, Comcast and ViacomCBS announced a partnership to launch a new streaming service in more than 20 European territories. SkyShowtime would replace already existing Paramount+ in the Nordics while launching a fully new service in Albania, Andorra, Bosnia and Herzegovina, Bulgaria, Croatia, Czech Republic, Denmark, Finland, Hungary, Kosovo, Montenegro, Netherlands, North Macedonia, Norway, Poland, Portugal, Romania, Serbia, Slovakia, Slovenia, Spain, and Sweden.  

Streaming was renamed as "Paramount Streaming", in-line with the rebranding of parent company ViacomCBS to Paramount Global in February 2022.

Properties  
Some of the digital media properties under Paramount Streaming are 

 Paramount+
 Showtime
 Pluto TV
 BET+ 
 Noggin
 CBS News (streaming service)
 CBS Sports HQ 
 Mixible
 SkyShowtime (50%, joint-venture streaming service owned and operated by Comcast (through Sky Group) and Paramount Global (through Showtime Networks)

Divested/defunct 
When the company was known as CBS Interactive, it owned several websites, most of which were sold to Red Ventures in 2020. Its former websites are: Radio.com, BNET, CNET, Download.com, TechRepublic, ZDNet, GameFAQs, GameSpot, Giant Bomb, onGamers, TVGuide.com, Chowhound, TV.com, Metacritic, Comic Vine, GameRankings, MetroLyrics and UrbanBaby.

References 

1997 establishments in California
American companies established in 1997
Mass media companies established in 1997
Streaming